The Fabulous Furry Freak Brothers is an underground comic about a fictional trio of stoner characters, created by the American artist Gilbert Shelton. The Freak Brothers first appeared in The Rag, an underground newspaper published in Austin, Texas, beginning in May 1968, and were regularly reprinted in underground papers around the United States and in other parts of the world. Later their adventures were published in a series of comic books.

The lives of the Freak Brothers revolve around the procurement and enjoyment of recreational drugs, particularly marijuana. The comics present a critique of the establishment while satirizing counterculture.

Fat Freddy's Cat appears in many of the stories, spinning off his own cartoon strip (which appeared as part of the Freak Brothers comic page, in the manner of older comic strip double features) and later some full-length episodes.

An animated TV series adaptation, The Freak Brothers, was released on Tubi on November 14, 2021.

Publication history 
The Freak Brothers first appeared in The Rag, an underground newspaper published in Austin, Texas, beginning in May 1968. Their debut was in an advertising flyer for a winter 1968 film short called The Texas Hippies March on the Capitol. Freak Brothers strips soon became popular and, thanks to the Underground Press Syndicate, were regularly reprinted in underground papers around the United States and in other parts of the world.

The Freak Brothers' first comic book appearance was in Feds 'n' Heads, self-published by Shelton in the spring of 1968 (and later re-issued in multiple printings by Berkeley's the Print Mint). They also appeared in the first two issues of Jay Lynch's Bijou Funnies. In 1969 Shelton and three friends from Texas founded Rip Off Press in San Francisco, which took over publication of all subsequent Freak Brothers comics. The first compilation of their adventures, The Collected Adventures of the Fabulous Furry Freak Brothers, had its first printing in 1971 and has been continually in print ever since. 

A weekly Freak Brothers comic strip was syndicated by Rip Off Press to underground and student publications in the 1970s, along with the related strip Fat Freddy's Cat. In addition to those strips, new adventures appeared in magazines such as Playboy, High Times, and Rip Off Comix; these too were collected in comic book form. Shelton continued to write and draw the series until 1992, in collaboration with Dave Sheridan (1974–1982, his death) and Paul Mavrides (1978-1992).

The majority of the comic books consist of one or more multi-page stories together with a number of one-page strips; many of the latter have a one-row skit featuring Fat Freddy's Cat at the bottom of the page. Issues #8-10 contained only the long-form story "The Idiots Abroad", which The Comics Journal listed as #44 of the "100 Greatest Comics of the Century." The UK newspaper The Guardian said of a 2003 reprint of the story that, "The graphic quality is, even in slightly muddy reproduction, astonishing. Depictions of various European cities recall Hergé in their accuracy and detail ... As for the subject matter, considering the dates of composition, it has hardly dated."

Characters 

The Freak Brothers are not siblings. They are a threesome of freaks (similar to, but distinct from, hippies) from San Francisco.

 Freewheelin' Franklin Freek, although laid-back, is the most street-smart of the trio. Apparently he has always been on the streets and it appears that he is several years older than the others. He is certainly old enough to be troubled at times by impotence. In one story he reveals that he grew up in an orphanage and never knew his parents. Tall and skinny, he has a big bulbous nose, a waterfall mustache and a ponytail. He wears cowboy boots and a cowboy hat. In one strip, he runs into an ex-girlfriend who has a child that bears a striking resemblance to him. He does his best to evade them and is relieved when she does not recognize him. In another strip, when he meets his own (possible) father, the same plot is inverted. Depending on the level of colorization used in the strip in question, Franklin's hair is red, blonde, or light brown.

 Phineas T. Phreak is the intellectual and idealist of the group. He has enough mastery of chemistry to create new drugs and takes an avid interest in politics. Of the three, he is the most committed to social change and environmental issues. He is from Texas and while his mother is relaxed and open-minded, his father is a card-carrying member of the John Birch Society. He is the hairiest of the brothers—tall and skinny with a thick bush of black hair, a beard, a nose bearing more than a passing resemblance to a joint, and glasses. He is the stereotypical left-wing radical, bearing a superficial resemblance to Abbie Hoffman or Jerry Rubin.

 Fat Freddy Freekowtski is the least intelligent of the trio and is most likely to be preoccupied with food. He is moderately overweight, with curly yellow hair and a mustache. His compulsion to eat is the subject of several of the adventures of the group. Fat Freddy frequently gets "burned" during drug transactions; when he does "score" he typically contrives to lose the drugs in various ways, such as by dumping them out of a shopping bag in front of a cooling fan, which then blows them out the window onto a police car. Fat Freddy comes from an unexceptional large family in Cleveland.  In The Idiots Abroad, Freddy visits the Polish village of Gfatsk, where everybody happens to look like him. He is driven away by an angry mob as soon as they hear the name Freekowtski.

Other recurring characters include:

 Fat Freddy's Cat appears mainly in his own, separate strip at the bottom of the one-page Freak Brothers strips (getting his start just as Krazy Kat did). He also has several multi-page stories devoted to him. Many of his strips parallel a storyline in the corresponding Freak Brothers story, and often have themes of a scatological nature. He has several "nephews" who refer to him as "Uncle F." and sometimes finds himself confronting an organized army of cockroaches or a huge tribe of mice who share the apartment with the Freak Brothers. He is far smarter than his owner (whom he frequently refers to as "the obese one") and regards the Freak Brothers with amused contempt, sometimes using their headphones as a litter box. He is also the subject of several spin-off collections of stories.

 Norbert the Nark, an inept DEA agent who is continually trying, and failing, to arrest the Freak Brothers.

 Hiram "Country" Cowfreak, a hippy who grows vast quantities of marijuana at his isolated farmstead. He is referred to as the Freak Brothers' "cousin".

 Dealer McDope, one of the trio's dealers. He is often mentioned in the strips but rarely appears in person. The character was initially created by Dave Sheridan for the Rip Off Press title Mother's Oats Comix.

 Tricky Prickears, The star of a comic book within the comic that the Freak Brothers enjoy reading. He is billed as "The Freak Brothers' favorite law enforcement officer" Tricky is a blind, deaf and reactionary detective and the character is a parody of Dick Tracy, to the extent that Shelton drew his stories in a different style, resembling that of Tracy's creator Chester Gould.

 Governor Rodney Richpigge, a stereotypically rich, corrupt politician whom the Freak Brothers hold in general contempt. The Governor's son is a cocaine dealer.

Storylines and themes 

Drug use is the predominant theme that runs throughout all volumes of this title. The protagonists "live in a state of blissful torpor relieved only by bursts of paranoia or stimulant-induced frenzy." Marijuana is the most frequently mentioned, but numerous other stimulants and hallucinogens are mentioned as well. Heroin is usually missing from the list. In one adventure, Franklin is shown to turn down an offer of "smack" when hitching a ride.

Food is a recurring subject. These stories most often involve Fat Freddy and his marijuana-induced "munchies" (increased appetite). The squalor engendered by the Brothers' indolence is often highlighted; several strips feature the household's cockroach population, ruled over by a fascist monarchy. Several stories satirize governments, particularly the U.S. government. These stories invariably show politicians and their agents as corrupt, incompetent, or both. The theme of foreign travel is sometimes explored, most notably in the three-part Idiots Abroad series.

It is common for the story-lines to begin with an air of realism, but rapidly descend into comic pantomime.

Classic Freak Brothers stories include:
 Grass Roots: The Brothers find a year's supply of cocaine and move to the country with the proceeds. They snort it all in two days. The Brothers are joined by a trio of hippie women who join them in their misadventures: the dilapidated farmhouse, Freddy's run in with a hillbilly moonshiner, the rumor of gold on the property, and Phineas running for sheriff.
 Chariot of the Globs: Fat Freddy's Cat is abducted by aliens.
The Fabulous Furry Freak Brothers in the 21st Century: The Brothers experience life in the future.
Knock 'em Dead: The Brothers form a punk band.
 The 7th Voyage of the Fabulous Furry Freak Brothers: A Mexican Odyssey: The Brothers holiday in Mexico, are thrown in jail and escape with the help of shaman Don Longjuan, in an oblique parody of the Carlos Castaneda books.
 The Idiots Abroad: The Brothers are split up attempting to travel to Colombia hoping to score cheap dope down there, yet none of them manages to reach Bogotá; Fat Freddy accidentally joins a group of nuclear terrorists in Scotland before disrupting the International Workers' Day military parade in Moscow, USSR and being subsequently sold to slavery in Africa; Franklin is almost killed by a native apocalyptic South American cult before joining a group of pirates; while Phineas ends up in Mecca and becomes the world's richest man after founding a new religion.

Catchphrases 

The Freak Brothers comics include several catchphrases:

Film and TV adaptations 

In 1978, without permission from Gilbert Shelton, the Fabulous Furry Freak Brothers appeared in the full-length pornographic film Up in Flames. The story involves the brothers' attempts to raise cash to make their rent deadline (the trio being in danger of being evicted from their apartment). Fat Freddy gains employment at a local food store run by graphic artist Robert Crumb's character Mr. Natural (also used without permission).

In 1979, Universal Studios paid Shelton and Rip Off Press $250,000 for the rights to make a live-action Fabulous Furry Freak Brothers film. Shelton received the bulk of the money, which enabled him to live part-time in Europe. Meanwhile, the Universal-produced Freak Brothers film never made it to the production stage.

In 2006, the company Grass Roots Films began production on a feature-length clay animation film based on the series, called Grass Roots, co-produced by German distribution company X Filme. In 2013, work on the film stopped.

An animated television series adaptation titled The Freak Brothers, based on the characters and set in modern San Francisco, was released on Tubi on November 14, 2021. The series was preceded on May 6, 2020, by a mini-episode titled "Kentucky Fried Freaks". The series features Woody Harrelson, Pete Davidson, John Goodman, and Tiffany Haddish as voice actors for the three Freaks and the cat respectively. Courtney Solomon and Mark Canton serve as executive producers, with Jeffrey Scott Edell serving as Co-Executive Producer, alongside Adam DeVine and Blake Anderson who also provide voice acting. The series is animated by Starburns Industries studio, which also worked on Rick and Morty. In May 2022, the series was renewed for a second season.

In popular culture 
Fat Freddy's Drop, formed in the late 1990s, is a Wellington, New Zealand, band that took its name from the Freak Brothers comics. According to the band, individual doses of a certain type of LSD popular in Wellington at that time had the image of Fat Freddy's Cat printed on it. Dropping — common slang for taking LSD — Fat Freddies became the inspiration for the band's name.

Director Paul Thomas Anderson said the look of Joaquin Phoenix's lead character, Larry "Doc" Sportello, in Anderson's 2014 adaptation of the Thomas Pynchon novel Inherent Vice, was based in part on Freewheelin' Franklin Freek:

Sports 
The ultra supporters of Serie B Italian football (soccer) team Ternana Calcio, from the Italian Umbrian city of Terni are called "The Freak Brothers". Like many Italians ultras, they are linked with the political left.

Places 
Fat Freddy's Restaurant, in Galway, Ireland, has arcana and other memorabilia relating to the Fabulous Furry Freak Brothers and Fat Freddy's Cat. There is also an inn in Olongapo, Philippines, called "The Fabulous Furry Freak Brothers Stagger Inn".

Bibliography

The Fabulous Furry Freak Brothers series 

Almost all of the titles in the series have a title in words. Issues #0–7 and #12–13 are in black and white; issues #8–11 were produced in both color and black-and-white editions.

 Freak Brothers No. 0: Underground Classics #1 (Jan. 1985)
 Freak Brothers No. 1: The Collected Adventures Of... (1971)
 Freak Brothers No. 2: Further Adventures of those... (Mar. 1972)
 Freak Brothers No. 3: A Year Passes Like Nothing (1973)
 Freak Brothers No. 4: Brother, Can You Spare 75¢ for the... (Nov. 1975)
 Freak Brothers No. 5: Grass Roots (May 1977)
 Freak Brothers No. 6: Six Snappy Sockeroos (June 1980)
 Freak Brothers No. 7: Several Short Stories (1982)
 Freak Brothers No. 8: The Idiots Abroad, Part I (1984)
 Freak Brothers No. 9: The Idiots Abroad, Part II (1985)
 Freak Brothers No. 10: The Idiots Abroad, Part III (1989)
 Freak Brothers No. 11 (1990)
 Freak Brothers No. 12 (1992)
 Freak Brothers No. 13 (1997)—black-and-white reprints of stories from Thoroughly Ripped (Rip Off Press, 1978) plus a new cover and one story never before printed in the U.S.: "The Plant"
 Fifty Freakin' Years with the Fabulous Furry Freak Brothers (Knockabout Comics, 2017)—new strips by Shelton, as well as his written introduction

Compilations and collections 

Several compilation titles have been published that merge several of the original titles into one book.

 Thoroughly Ripped with the Fabulous Furry Freak Brothers and Fat Freddy's Cat! (Rip Off Press, 1978) —full-color collection of stories from High Times magazine published from Dec. 1976 to Sept. 1978 (as well as one story from Playboy magazine). Book came in two editions, one of which included a board game called "It's a Raid".

 The Fabulous Furry Freak Brothers in Grass Roots (Rip Off Press, 1984) —full-color reprints of material from comic book issues #5 and 7.

 The Complete Fabulous Furry Freak Brothers, Volume One (Knockabout Comics, 2001) —reprints comic book issues #0–7 and 12

 The Complete Fabulous Furry Freak Brothers, Volume Two (Knockabout Comics, 2004) —color reprints comic books issues #8-11 and 13. (Note: according to the reverse title pages, the second volume has the same )

  The Fabulous Furry Freak Brothers Omnibus (Knockabout Comics, 2008) —collection of the entire series, including some stories and covers done after publication of the "Complete" books. Includes everything from the two books above, except for the covers of Rip Off Comics 15 and 21, which do not show the Freak Brothers.

Explanatory notes

References

External links 
 Rip Off Press, Inc., publishers of the Freak Brothers comics in the U.S.
 Knockabout Comics, publishers of the Freak Brothers comics in the U.K.
  The Fabulous Furry Freak Brothers at Don Markstein's Toonopedia. Archived from the original on April 13, 2012.

 
1968 comics debuts
1997 comics endings
American comics adapted into films
American comic strips
Comics adapted into animated films
Comics adapted into animated series
Comics set in the 1960s
Comics set in the 1970s
Comics set in the 1980s
Comics set in the 1990s
Comics set in San Francisco
Psychedelic art
Underground comix
Fictional trios